The Man Outside is a 1913 Comedy film.

Cast

External links 
 imdb description

1913 films
American silent short films
American black-and-white films
1913 comedy films
1913 short films
Silent American comedy films
American comedy short films
1910s American films